Searcy County is a county located in the U.S. state of Arkansas. As of the 2020 census, the population was 7,828. The county seat is Marshall. The county was formed December 13, 1838, from a portion of Marion County and named for Richard Searcy, the first clerk and judge in the Arkansas Territory. The city of Searcy, Arkansas, some 70 miles away, shares the name despite having never been part of Searcy County.  The county is an alcohol prohibition or dry county.

History
During the American Civil War, Searcy County, Arkansas had strong, pro-Union leanings, forming an organization known as the "Arkansas Peace Society".

Chocolate Roll Capital of the World

The Chocolate Roll is a dessert endemic to Searcy but little known outside the near region.
A typical Chocolate Roll is made from pie dough spread with a mixture of cocoa powder, shortening, and sugar, then rolled up and baked.
In 2012 The Greater Searcy County Chamber of Commerce
declared Searcy County the "Chocolate Roll Capital of the World™", and asserted trademarks.
Since 2012 Marshall High School has hosted an annual Chocolate Roll Festival that includes the World Champion Chocolate Roll Contest. The 6th was held on  March 18, 2017.

Geography

Major highways
 U.S. Highway 65
 Arkansas Highway 14
 Arkansas Highway 16
 Arkansas Highway 27
 Arkansas Highway 66
 Arkansas Highway 74
 Arkansas Highway 235
 Arkansas Highway 333
 Arkansas Highway 374
 Arkansas Highway 377

Adjacent counties
Marion County (north)
Baxter County (northeast)
Stone County (east)
Van Buren County (south)
Pope County (southwest)
Newton County (west)
Boone County (northwest)

National protected areas
 Buffalo National River (part)
 Ozark National Forest (part)

Demographics

2020 census

As of the 2020 United States census, there were 7,828 people, 3,327 households, and 2,333 families residing in the county.

2000 census
As of the 2000 census, there were 8,261 people, 3,523 households, and 2,466 families residing in the county.  The population density was 12 people per square mile (5/km2).  There were 4,292 housing units at an average density of 6 per square mile (2/km2).  The racial makeup of the county was 97.26% White, 0.04% Black or African American, 0.75% Native American, 0.15% Asian, 0.01% Pacific Islander, 0.45% from other races, and 1.34% from two or more races.  1.04% of the population were Hispanic or Latino of any race.

There were 3,523 households, out of which 27.90% had children under the age of 18 living with them, 58.50% were married couples living together, 7.70% had a female householder with no husband present, and 30.00% were non-families. 28.00% of all households were made up of individuals, and 14.30% had someone living alone who was 65 years of age or older.  The average household size was 2.33 and the average family size was 2.83.

In the county, the population was spread out, with 22.70% under the age of 18, 6.90% from 18 to 24, 24.50% from 25 to 44, 26.70% from 45 to 64, and 19.20% who were 65 years of age or older.  The median age was 42 years. For every 100 females there were 98.00 males.  For every 100 females age 18 and over, there were 94.80 males.

The median income for a household in the county was $21,397, and the median income for a family was $27,580. Males had a median income of $21,768 versus $16,276 for females. The per capita income for the county was $12,536.  About 17.80% of families and 23.80% of the population were below the poverty line, including 31.00% of those under age 18 and 26.60% of those age 65 or over.

Government and politics

Along with adjacent Newton County, Searcy is unique among Arkansas counties in being traditionally Republican in political leanings even during the overwhelmingly Democratic "Solid South" era. This Republicanism resulted from their historical paucity of slaves, in turn created by infertile soils unsuitable for intensive cotton farming, and produced support for the Union during the Civil War. These were the only two counties in Arkansas to be won by Alf Landon in 1936, Wendell Willkie in 1940, Charles Evans Hughes in 1916, and even Calvin Coolidge in 1924. In Presidential elections post-1932, Harry S. Truman and Jimmy Carter are the only Democrats to carry the county. In the 1992 election George H. W. Bush won his second-highest margin in the state, despite former Arkansas governor Bill Clinton being the Democratic nominee. In fact, Republican nominee Bob Dole also carried the county 4 years later despite Clinton's success almost everywhere else in the state. Republicans have received over 60 percent of the vote in the county in every election since 2000. In 2016, Donald Trump received more than 79 percent of the vote in the county, while former Arkansas First Lady Hillary Clinton received just 16 percent. In 2020, Trump received more than 83 percent of the vote. Trump's performances in both elections are the best of any candidate in the county's history.

The county is in Arkansas's 1st congressional district, which from Reconstruction until 2010 sent only Democrats to the U.S. House. That year, it elected Republican Rick Crawford, who currently holds the seat as of 2014. In the Arkansas House of Representatives Searcy County is represented by second-term Republican David Branscum from the 83rd (and formerly the 90th prior to 2013) district.
The state senator, Missy Thomas Irvin, is also a Republican, serving her second term from the 18th district.

Since 1980, in gubernatorial races, the county has tended to favor Republicans in all but one contest. It voted for Frank White in his successful run against freshman Democratic incumbent Bill Clinton in 1980. It supported White again in 1982 and 1986 in rematches with Clinton. It also voted for Woody Freeman over Clinton in 1984. It was the only county in Arkansas where Republican Sheffield Nelson won in both 1990 and 1994. In 1990, it was Nelson's best county in the entire state, winning 64 percent to then-Governor Bill Clinton's 36 percent in Searcy  County. In 1994, Searcy County was among the two counties to vote for Nelson over incumbent Democrat Jim Guy Tucker, Benton County being the other (which actually voted for Clinton over Nelson in 1990).

In 1998, Searcy County voted for Republican Mike Huckabee with just under 70 percent, and again in 2002, albeit with a reduced margin of 57 percent. In 2006, it voted 52 percent for Republican ex-Congressman Asa Hutchinson, who lost to Democrat Mike Beebe. In 2010, however, it did vote for incumbent Democrat Mike Beebe with a margin of 57 percent to 40 percent over former state Senator Jim Keet, the first time it had done so since 1978. Keet was regarded as a weak candidate, as he failed to carry a single county.

Education
Public education is provided for early childhood, elementary and secondary education from multiple school districts including:

 Searcy County School District, which includes Marshall High School
 Ozark Mountain School District, which includes Searcy County-based St. Joe High School and St. Joe Elementary School.

Communities

Cities
Leslie
Marshall (county seat)

Towns
 Big Flat (mostly in Baxter County)
Gilbert
Pindall
St. Joe

Census-designated places
Witts Springs

Townships

See also
 List of lakes in Searcy County, Arkansas
 National Register of Historic Places listings in Searcy County, Arkansas

References

External links
 Searcy County Arkansas Chamber of Commerce
 Searcy County Library (extensive local genealogy records and fulltime genealogy staff)
 Searcy County entry in the Encyclopedia of Arkansas
 Searcy County Map from Encyclopedia of Arkansas
 Searcy County Map from U. S. Census Bureau

 
1838 establishments in Arkansas
Populated places established in 1838